Meir ben Elijah of Norwich, also known as Meir of England, was a mediaeval English Jewish poet. He is acknowledged as the "chief representative of the poetic art
among the Jews of medieval England."

Little is known of his life, but some scholars have speculated that he was among the Jews expelled from England in 1290. It is possible that Meir was a son of Elias Levesque.

One long elegiac poem and fifteen smaller ones by him are found in a Vatican manuscript, from which they were published by Abraham Berliner in 1887. Among them is the liturgical poem Oyevi bim’eirah tikkov ('Put a Curse on My Enemy'), decrying the persecution suffered by English Jews. His work shows the influence of both Ashkenazic and Sephardic piyyutim.

References
 

13th-century English Jews
13th-century English poets
Hebrew-language poets
Writers from Norwich
Medieval Jewish poets